Oral Oaks is an unincorporated community in Lunenburg County, Virginia, United States. Its post office  is closed.

References

Unincorporated communities in Lunenburg County, Virginia
Unincorporated communities in Virginia